A65 or A-65 may refer to:

 A65 road (England), a major road in England
 A65 motorway (France), a major road in France
 A65 motorway (Germany), a road connecting Kandel and Wörth am Rhein
 A65 motorway (Netherlands)
 A65 motorway (Spain)
 Benoni Defense, in the Encyclopaedia of Chess Openings
 BSA A65 Rocket, a motorcycle made by BSA